Trần Văn Vũ may refer to:

Trần Văn Vũ (futsal player) (born 1990)
Trần Văn Vũ (footballer, born 1992)
Trần Văn Vũ (footballer, born 1994)